Adam Kisiel also Adam Kysil, (1580 or 1600-1653) was a Ruthenian nobleman, the Voivode of Kyiv (1649-1653) and castellan or voivode of Czernihów (1639-1646). Kisiel has become better known for his mediation during the Khmelnytsky Uprising.

Family
Adam Kisiel was a member of the noble family Kisiel, which used its own coat of arms, sometime called Światołdycz. They were a Ruthenian family, originally from Volyn. His grandfather, Gniewosz Kisiel, was a colonel in the service of the Polish king Sigismund I the Old, and lost his life in the battle of Orsza. His father, Grzegorz, was a podsędek of Włodzimierz. He signed his name as Kisiel Niskinicki. Adam's brother was Mikołaj Kisiel (d. 1651), a chorąży of Nowogród Siewierski. Adam Kisiel was married to Anastazja Krystyna Bohuszewicz. She was probably a daughter of Filion Bohuszewicz Hulkiewicz, widow after Butowicz. The couple was childless. Adam Kisiel described himself as a Polish noble (Jestem szlachcic polski, literally: I am a Polish noble).

Life 
Adam Kisiel according to the older historiography was born around 1580. After Tadeusz Jan Lubomirski in 1905 published his work Adam Kisiel wojewoda kijowski, where is contained information that on the grave inscription of Adam Kisiel is mentioned that he died as 53 years old, historians stated that he was born in 1600.

Kisiel was baptized into the Eastern Orthodox faith. He was educated in Zamojski Academy in spirit of humanism and tolerance.

Adam Kisiel fought under the order of Stanisław Żółkiewski since 1617 to 1620. He fought in the battle of Cecora (1620) and in the battle of Chocim (1621).

Kisiel persuaded king Władysław IV Vasa to reinstate the Orthodox hierarchy and he acted as an intermediary between the Royal Court, General Sejm, and Cossacks.

He was a mediator in the 1637 Pavlyuk Uprising. Afterwards he was responsible for the conscription of 5,000 Registered Cossacks. Kisiel was also appointed as the Voivode of Bratslav in 1647.

During the Khmelnytsky Uprising he was one of the most prominent members of the negotiations and pro-Cossack factions among the szlachta. In the very beginning of the Uprising he sent an Eastern Orthodox monk, Petroni Łaska, to try to calm down the Cossacks and begin negotiations. The Sejm resolution of 22 July 1648 chose him, Aleksander Sielski, podkomorzy poznański, Franicszek Dubrawski, podkomorzy przemyski and Teodor Obuchowicz, podkomorzy mozyrski, to negotiate with Khmelnytsky. The negotiations ended in failure by February 1649.

Adam Kisiel died on 3 May 1653.

See also
 Cassian Sakowicz

References

Sources 
 Frank Sysyn. Between Poland and the Ukraine: The Dilemma of Adam Kysil, 1600-1653

Secular senators of the Polish–Lithuanian Commonwealth
Ruthenian nobility of the Polish–Lithuanian Commonwealth
Eastern Orthodox Christians from Poland
People from Volyn Oblast
People from Volhynian Voivodeship

16th-century births
1653 deaths

Year of birth uncertain